Siayan is one of the Batanes Islands. There are several detached rocks off Siayan's northeast side, rendering the channel between it and Mabudis unsafe for larger vessels.

See also
 List of islands of the Philippines

References

Islands of Batanes